Yeong-gi, also spelled Yeong-ki, Young-gi, Young-ki, Young-kee, or Yong-gi, is a Korean masculine given name. Its meaning depends on the hanja used to write each syllable of the name. There are 34 hanja with the reading "yeong" and 68 hanja with the reading "gi" on the South Korean government's official list of hanja which may be registered for use in given names. According to South Korean government data, it was the fourth-most popular name for baby boys born in 1940.

People with this name include:
Choi Yeong-gi (1925–2004), South Korean track and field athlete
 (born 1929), North Korean spy, one of South Korea's unconverted long-term prisoners
Kim Yeong-gi (basketball) (born 1936), South Korean basketball player
Young-Kee Kim (born 1962), South Korean-born American physicist
Verbal (rapper) (born Ryu Young-gi, 1975), Zainichi Korean rapper, member of hip-hop duo m-flo
Min Young-ki (born 1976), South Korean football defender (K-League Challenge)
Kim Yeong-gi (born 1985), Zainichi Korean footballer (J.League)
Son Young-ki (born 1985), South Korean foil fencer

See also
List of Korean given names
Oh Young-ki (born 1965), South Korean former handball player
Young Gi Han (born 1984), South Korean artist

References

Korean masculine given names